De Luz Heights (De Luz, Spanish for "Of Light") is an unincorporated community that is in northwestern San Diego County, California, United States.

Geography

De Luz Heights is on the Santa Rosa Plateau of the Santa Ana Mountains. It is between De Luz Road to the west and Sandia Creek Drive to the east. It is northwest of Fallbrook, southwest of Temecula, and immediately east of Marine Corps Base Camp Pendleton.

De Luz Heights is an agricultural community with narrow country lanes lined by avocado groves, commercial flower nurseries, citrus ranches, and vineyards.

See also
Santa Rosa Plateau Ecological Reserve

References

External links
 De Luz Community Services District

Unincorporated communities in Riverside County, California
Unincorporated communities in San Diego County, California
Santa Ana Mountains
Unincorporated communities in California